Samuel Hays (September 10, 1783July 1, 1868) was an American politician who served as a Democratic member of the U.S. House of Representatives for Pennsylvania's 22nd congressional district from 1843 to 1845.

Biography
Samuel Hays was born in County Donegal in the Kingdom of Ireland.  In 1792, he emigrated to the United States with his mother, and settled in Franklin, Pennsylvania.  He served as treasurer of Venango County, Pennsylvania in 1808.  He was elected sheriff of Venango County in 1808, 1820, 1829, and in 1833.  He was a member of the Pennsylvania House of Representatives in 1813, 1816; 1823, and 1825, and served in the Pennsylvania State Senate for the 22nd district from 1839 to 1842.  He was a member of the board of trustees of Allegheny College in Meadville, Pennsylvania, from 1837 to 1861.  He served as brigadier general, commanding the First Brigade, Seventeenth Division, Pennsylvania Militia, from 1841 to 1843.

Hays was elected as a Democrat to the Twenty-eighth Congress.  He was not a candidate for renomination in 1844.  He was engaged in iron manufactures, operating furnaces on French Creek, near Franklin.  In 1847, he was appointed marshal for the western district of Pennsylvania.  He served as associate judge of the district court in 1856.  He died in Franklin in 1868, interment in Old Town Cemetery and reinterment in Franklin Cemetery.

Hays' son, Major General Alexander Hays, was a noteworthy Union Army officer during the US Civil War and close personal friend of Ulysses S. Grant.

Footnotes

Sources

The Political Graveyard

|-

|-

1783 births
1868 deaths
19th-century American judges
19th-century American politicians
Burials in Pennsylvania
Democratic Party members of the United States House of Representatives from Pennsylvania
Irish emigrants to the United States (before 1923)
Democratic Party members of the Pennsylvania House of Representatives
Pennsylvania district justices
Pennsylvania National Guard personnel
Democratic Party Pennsylvania state senators
People from Franklin, Pennsylvania
Politicians from County Donegal
United States Marshals